Todd Andrew Pinnington (born 21 March 1973, in Hobart, Tasmania), is an Australian cricketer, who played for the Tasmanian Tigers from 1994 until 2001. An agile wicketkeeper, Pinnington long suffered from being considered second choice behind the reliable Mark Atkinson. He is also an excellent lower order attacking batsman who has torn apart many attacks in the Tasmanian Grade Cricket competition.

See also
 List of Tasmanian representative cricketers

External links

1973 births
Living people
Australian cricketers
Tasmania cricketers
Cricketers from Hobart